Mount Amherst is a peak rising to 2,400 m between Holdsworth Glacier and Scott Glacier, 3 nautical miles (6 km) north-northeast of McNally Peak, in the Queen Maud Mountains. Mapped by United States Geological Survey (USGS) from surveys and U.S. Navy aerial photographs, 1960–64. The geology of the peak was studied in the 1978–79 season by a United States Antarctic Research Program (USARP)-Arizona State University field party. Named by Advisory Committee on Antarctic Names (US-ACAN) after Amherst College, Amherst, MA, alma mater of Michael F. Sheridan, a member of the field party.

Mountains of the Ross Dependency
Amundsen Coast
Queen Maud Mountains